Rösler may refer to the following:
 Rösler as a family name
Antonio Rosetti (c. 1750–1792) (born Franz Anton Rösler), classical era composer and double bass player
 Martha Rosler (born 1943), American artist
Margit Rösler, German mathematician
Philipp Rösler (born 1973), Vietnamese-born German politician
Sascha Rösler (born 1977), German footballer who plays as a midfielder for Alemannia Aachen.
Uwe Rösler (born 1968), German football player and manager

Other Roesler
 Roesler, a red Austrian wine grape.

German-language surnames